Baile de Los Locos is Voodoo Glow Skulls' third full-length album. It was released on May 5, 1997.  The album has 25 tracks; tracks 13–24 are left blank; track 25 is a cover of the Christmas song "Feliz Navidad" (Merry Christmas). The title translates as "Dance of the Crazy People".

Track listing

References

Voodoo Glow Skulls albums
1997 albums
Epitaph Records albums